PSR J0952–0607 is a massive millisecond pulsar in a binary system, located between  away from Earth in the constellation Sextans. It holds the record for being the most massive neutron star known , with a mass  times as much as the Sun—potentially close to the Tolman–Oppenheimer–Volkoff mass upper limit for neutron stars. The pulsar rotates at a frequency of 707 Hz (1.41 ms period), making it the second-fastest-spinning pulsar known, and the fastest-spinning pulsar that is located in the Milky Way.

PSR J0952–0607 was discovered by the Low-Frequency Array (LOFAR) radio telescope during a search for pulsars in 2016. It is classified as a black widow pulsar, a type of pulsar harboring a closely-orbiting substellar-mass companion that is being ablated by the pulsar's intense high-energy solar winds and gamma-ray emissions. The pulsar's high-energy emissions have been detected in gamma-ray and X-ray wavelengths.

Discovery 
PSR J0952–0607 was first identified as an unassociated gamma-ray source detected during the first seven years of the Fermi Gamma-ray Space Telescope's all-sky survey since 2008. Because of its optimal location away from the crowded Galactic Center and its pulsar-like gamma-ray emission peak at 1.4 GeV, it was deemed a prime millisecond pulsar candidate for follow-up. The pulsar was reobserved and confirmed by the Low-Frequency Array (LOFAR) radio telescope in the Netherlands on 25 December 2016, which revealed a 707-Hz radio pulsation frequency alongside radial acceleration by an unseen binary companion. Further LOFAR observations took place from January to February 2017, alongside radio observations by the Green Bank Telescope in Green Bank, West Virginia in March 2017. Optical observations by the 2.54-meter Isaac Newton Telescope on La Palma detected and confirmed the pulsar's companion at a faint apparent magnitude of 23 in January 2017. The discovery was published in The Astrophysical Journal Letters and was announced in a NASA press release in September 2017.

Distance and location 
The distance of PSR J0952–0607 from Earth is highly uncertain.

Binary system 
The PSR J0952–0607 binary system comprises a massive pulsar and a substellar-mass (<) companion in close orbit around it. Because of this configuration, this system falls under the category of black widow pulsars that "consume" their companion, by analogy with the mating behavior of the eponymous black widow spider. The companion is continuously losing mass through ablation by intense high-energy solar winds and gamma-ray emissions from the pulsar, which then accretes some of the companion's lost material onto itself.

Companion 

Because it orbits so closely, the companion is presumably tidally locked, with one hemisphere always facing the pulsar. The companion does not appear to eclipse the pulsar, indicating that its orbit is oriented nearly face-on with an inclination of 60° with respect to the plane perpendicular to Earth's line of sight. The companion's orbital motion also does not appear to modulate the pulsar's pulsations, signifying a circular orbit with negligible orbital eccentricity.

This hemispherical temperature difference corresponds to a difference in hemisphere luminosities, which in turn causes significant variability in apparent brightness as the companion rotates around the pulsar. This brightness variability is demonstrated in PSR J0952–0607's optical light curve, which exhibits an amplitude greater than one magnitude.

Mass 

Rotation and age 
PSR J0952–0607 rotates at a frequency of 707 Hz (1.41 ms period), making it the second-fastest-spinning pulsar known, and the fastest-spinning pulsar that is located in the Milky Way. Based on 7 years of precise pulsation timing data from gamma-ray and radio observations, the pulsar's rotation period is estimated to be slowing down at a spin-down rate less than  seconds per second, corresponding to a characteristic age of 4.9 billion years.

Magnetic field 
For context, ordinary pulsar magnetic fields usually lie on the order of teragauss, over 10,000 times greater than that of PSR J0952–0607. Other millisecond pulsars exhibit similarly weak magnetic fields, hinting at a common albeit unknown mechanism in these types of systems; possible explanations range from accreted matter burying the pulsar's surface magnetic field to heat-driven evolution of the pulsar's solid crust.

Gamma-ray emissions 
PSR J0952–0607 appears very faint in gamma-rays and was not detected in July 2011.

See also 
 Tolman–Oppenheimer–Volkoff limit
 Black Widow Pulsar, the prototypical namesake for the class of binary pulsars with ablating companions
 PSR J1748−2446ad, the fastest-spinning pulsar located in the globular cluster Terzan 5

Notes

References 

Millisecond pulsars
Binary stars
X-ray binaries
Sextans (constellation)
Astronomical objects discovered in 2016